The speaker is the presiding member of the Florida House of Representatives. The Speaker and his staff provide direction and coordination to employees throughout the House and serve the members in carrying out their constitutional responsibilities. The current Speaker is Paul Renner who has held the position since November 22, 2022.

Speakers

See also
Florida Democratic Party
Republican Party of Florida
List of presidents of the Florida Senate

References
 
 Sessions of the Florida Senate

Speakers
Florida
1845 establishments in Florida